Just Blues is an album by the American blues pianist Memphis Slim which was recorded in 1960 and released on Bluesville, a sublabel of Prestige Records. It was reissued by Fantasy in 1972 as part of the double LP Raining the Blues, along with No Strain, another album from the same sessions.

Reception

In his review for AllMusic, Stephen Cook wrote, "One of a handful of stellar albums Slim cut for Prestige's Bluesville label, the 12-track set offers a particularly pleasant way to check out the pianist's tasty keyboard work and wide-ranging topical bent."

Track listing 
All compositions by Peter Chatman except where noted.
 "Beer Drinking Woman" – 3:27   
 "Teasing the Blues" (Slim-Marshall) – 3:41    
 "The I.C. Blues" – 2:52 
 "Baby Doll" – 2:08    
 "Just Blues" – 3:35    
 "Blue and Disgusted" – 2:30 
 "Blue Brew" – 4:25 
 "Rack 'Em Back Jack" – 2:30 
 "Motherless Child" – 3:04    
 "Brenda" – 3:46    
 "When Your Dought Roller Is Gone" – 2:39     
 "Hey Slim" – 4:14

Personnel 
Memphis Slim – piano, vocals
Lafayette Thomas – guitar
Wendell Marshall – double bass
Buster 'Harpie' Brown – harmonica

References 

1961 albums
Memphis Slim albums
Bluesville Records albums
Albums recorded at Van Gelder Studio